Bruno Kozina (born 7 January 1992) is a Croatian handball player who plays for HSC Kreuzlingen.

Club career 
Kozina started his professional career in RK Zamet the premier handball club of Rijeka. He also plays for Croatian Premier League clubs HRK Karlovac and RK Buzet. In the season 2014/15 he moved to Swiss handball club Kadetten Schaffhausen. One year later he signs a contract with another Swiss club RTV 1879 Basel. In November 2017, he joined French side Cesson Rennes MHB. In the season 2018/19 he returned to RTV 1879 Basel. In October 2019 he signs a contract with Alpla HC Hard. In Januar 2020 he signs a contract with Váci KSE. In the season 2020/21 he sign with the Spanish club BM Puerto Sagunto.  In the season 2021/22 he sign with the Hungarian club Csurgói KK. In the season 2022/23 he returns in the Swiss Quickline Handball League to play for HSC Kreuzlingen.

Individual honours
 Season 2015/16 best field scorer in Swiss Handball League with 140 goals in 30 games.
 Season 2016/17 third field scorer in Swiss Handball League with 141 goals in 28 games.

Personal life
Bruno has an older brother Krešimir who is also a handball player.

References

External links
 Croatia Premier League stats
 Swiss Handball League stats
Liga Sacyr ASOBAL

1992 births
Living people
Croatian male handball players
People from Derventa
Handball players from Rijeka
Croatian expatriate sportspeople in Switzerland
Expatriate handball players
RK Zamet players
Croatian expatriate sportspeople in France